Veera Elavarasu, also spelled Veera Ilavarasan, was an Indian politician and a member of the Tamil Nadu Legislative Assembly. He was elected as a Marumalarchi Dravida Munnetra Kazhagam (MDMK) candidate for the Thirumangalam constituency. He died in November 2008.

References 

2008 deaths
Marumalarchi Dravida Munnetra Kazhagam politicians
Tamil Nadu MLAs 2006–2011
Year of birth missing